Terance Stanley Mann (born October 18, 1996) is an American professional basketball player for the Los Angeles Clippers of the National Basketball Association (NBA). He played college basketball for the Florida State Seminoles.

Early life and high school career
Mann was born in Brooklyn, New York and moved to Lowell, Massachusetts at the age of 10. His parents are from Saint Lucia. Mann's mother, Daynia La-Force, coached women's basketball at Rhode Island. He played for the Tilton School in New Hampshire. At Tilton School, he averaged 23.1 points and 7.8 rebounds per game as a senior. He led the school to a 31–5 record and the New England Preparatory School Athletic Conference Class AA championship. Mann was a First Team All-NEPSAC selection. Mann was a four-star recruit and signed with Florida State, turning down offers from Indiana, Boston College, Iowa, Maryland, Florida and West Virginia.

College career
As a freshman at Florida State, Mann averaged  5.2 points and 17 minutes per game playing behind Malik Beasley and Dwayne Bacon. He was named a captain as a sophomore and posted 8.4 points and 4.5 rebounds per game. Mann came down with a torn abdominal and groin muscle in the first round of the 2017 NCAA Tournament and was limited as the Seminoles reached the Elite Eight.

Mann posted 12.6 points, 5.4 rebounds and 2.6 assists per game as a junior. As a senior, Mann averaged 11.4 points and 6.5 rebounds per game. He led the team to a 29–8 record and the Sweet Sixteen of the NCAA Tournament. He finished his career as the third player in school history with over 1,200 points, 600 rebounds, 200 assists and 100 steals.

Professional career

Los Angeles Clippers (2019–present)
Mann was drafted with the 48th pick of the 2019 NBA draft by the Los Angeles Clippers. He played for the Clippers in the 2019 NBA Summer League.  On July 9, 2019, the Clippers announced that they had signed Mann. On October 24, 2019, Mann made his NBA debut, coming off the bench in a 141–122 win over the Golden State Warriors with a rebound. On March 18, 2020, the Clippers announced that Mann had undergone surgery to repair a ligament in his right hand. On August 14, 2020, in a game against the Oklahoma City Thunder, Mann recorded a then career-high 25 points, 14 rebounds and nine assists in 42 minutes.

During the Western Conference Semifinals, with Kawhi Leonard being injured, Mann was put in the starting lineup. In Game 6, Mann dropped a career-high 39 points on 7-of-10 shooting from three-point range in a 131–119 victory, sparking a 25-point comeback and leading the Clippers to the Western Conference Finals for the first time in franchise history.

On January 15, 2023, Mann scored a season-high 31 points during a 121–100 win over the Houston Rockets.

Career statistics

NBA

Regular season

|-
| style="text-align:left;"|
| style="text-align:left;"|L.A. Clippers
| 41 || 6 || 8.8 || .468 || .350 || .667 || 1.3 || 1.3 || .3 || .1 || 2.4
|-
| style="text-align:left;"|
| style="text-align:left;"|L.A. Clippers
| 67 || 10 || 18.9 || .509 || .418 || .830 || 3.6 || 1.6 || .4 || .2 || 7.0
|-
| style="text-align:left;"|
| style="text-align:left;"|L.A. Clippers
| 81 || 33|| 28.6 || .484 || .365 || .780 || 5.2 || 2.6 || .7 || .3 || 10.8
|- class="sortbottom"
| style="text-align:center;" colspan="2"|Career
| 189 || 49 || 20.9 || .491 || .379 || .786 || 3.8 || 1.9 || .5 || .2 || 7.6

Playoffs

|-
| style="text-align:left;"|2020
| style="text-align:left;"|L.A. Clippers
| 13 || 0 || 2.1 || .400 || .000 ||  || .5 || .1 || .1 || .0 || .3
|-
| style="text-align:left;"|2021
| style="text-align:left;"|L.A. Clippers
| 19 || 6 || 19.8 || .519 || .432 || .714 || 2.7 || .7 || .5 || .3 || 7.6
|- class="sortbottom"
| style="text-align:center;" colspan="2"|Career
| 32 || 6 || 12.6 || .514 || .410 || .714 || 1.8 || .5 || .3 || .2 || 4.6

College

|-
| style="text-align:left;"|2015–16
| style="text-align:left;"|Florida State
| 34 || 0 || 17.0 || .584 || .308 || .458 || 3.7 || .9 || .6 || .2 || 5.2
|-
| style="text-align:left;"|2016–17
| style="text-align:left;"|Florida State
| 35 || 34 || 25.0 || .576 || .304 || .663 || 4.5 || 1.7 || 1.0 || .2 || 8.4
|-
| style="text-align:left;"|2017–18
| style="text-align:left;"|Florida State
| 34 || 31 || 29.2 || .568 || .250 || .655 || 5.4 || 2.6 || .9 || .3 || 12.6
|-
| style="text-align:left;"|2018–19
| style="text-align:left;"|Florida State
| 37 || 36 || 31.7 || .505 || .390 || .790 || 6.5 || 2.5 || .7 || .3 || 11.4
|- class="sortbottom"
| style="text-align:center;" colspan="2"|Career
| 140 || 101 || 25.9 || .552 || .327 || .670 || 5.1 || 1.9 || .8 || .2 || 9.4

References

External links

 Florida State Seminoles bio

1996 births
Living people
Agua Caliente Clippers players
American men's basketball players
American people of Saint Lucian descent
Basketball players from Massachusetts
Basketball players from New York City
Florida State Seminoles men's basketball players
Los Angeles Clippers draft picks
Los Angeles Clippers players
Shooting guards
Small forwards
Sportspeople from Brooklyn
Sportspeople from Lowell, Massachusetts
Tilton School alumni